

Current members (2022)
Here 1 members KC Venugopal is representing Kerala in the Rajyasabha.

Keys:

There are total TEN seats reserved for Rajasthan in Rajya Sabha. Currently INC have 6 members and Congress BJP have 4 members in Rajya Sabha from Rajasthan.

Alphabetical list since 1952

References

External links
 List of Rajya Sabha Members
 List of Rajya Sabha Members Statewise
Rajasthan Rajya Sabha Members | MP List Party Wise Seats

Rajya Sabha members from Rajasthan
Rajasthan